Euriphene luteostriata is a butterfly in the family Nymphalidae. It is found in Cameroon and the Democratic Republic of the Congo (Ituri and northern Kivu).

References

Butterflies described in 1908
Euriphene